The Pakistan women's national table tennis team represents Pakistan in international table tennis competitions. It is administered by the Pakistan Table Tennis Federation (PTTF). Members of the team compete in singles, doubles, mixed doubles and team events at competitions including continental and regional games (Asian and South Asian Games) and continental championships.

History

1970s
In 1972, it competed in the inaugural ATTU Asian Table Tennis Championships held in Beijing, China.

Team Members

Siblings
The following sets of siblings have represented Pakistan internationally:
 Saeeda Sultana and Altaf Ali.
 Munira Fikree and Rukia Fikree.
 Rubina Shakoor, Seema Shakoor and Nazo Shakoor.
 Naseem Nazli and Shamim Nazli.
 Rahila Anjum and Naila Anjum.

Results

South Asian Games

Medals

References

Women's national team
Table Tennis
Women's sport in Pakistan